Lever Building is a historic commercial building located at Columbia, South Carolina. It was built in 1903, and is a three-story building faced with brown brick and terra cotta.

It was added to the National Register of Historic Places in 1979.

References

Commercial buildings on the National Register of Historic Places in South Carolina
Commercial buildings completed in 1903
Buildings and structures in Columbia, South Carolina
National Register of Historic Places in Columbia, South Carolina